380th may refer to:

380th (King's Own) Anti-Tank Regiment, Royal Artillery, Territorial Army unit of the British Army's Royal Artillery
380th Aero Squadron, training unit assigned to Selfridge Air National Guard Base in Harrison Township, Michigan, near Mount Clemens
380th Air Expeditionary Wing, provisional unit of the United States Air Force Air Combat Command (ACC), stationed at Al Dhafra Air Base, United Arab Emirates
380th Air Refueling Squadron, inactive United States Air Force unit
380th Expeditionary Operations Group, the operational flying component of the United States Air Force 380th Air Expeditionary Wing
380th Fighter Squadron, unit of Air Combat Command of the United States Air Force; flies the E-8C Joint STARS
380th Space Control Squadron (380 SPCS) is a space control unit located at Peterson AFB, Colorado

See also
380 (number)
380 (disambiguation)
380, the year 380 (CCCLXXX) of the Julian calendar
380 BC